Hanford Struble (May 14, 1842 – October 25, 1903) was an American lawyer, politician, and judge from New York.

Life 
Struble was born on May 14, 1842 in Milo, New York, the son of Levi Struble and Mary Misner. He grew up on a farm.

Struble attended the Starkey seminary from 1853 to 1857. He then went to Genesee College, graduating from there with honors in 1861. From 1861 to 1862, he worked as principal of Dundee Academy.

In July 1862, during the American Civil War, Struble enlisted in Company B of the 148th New York Infantry Regiment and was chosen first lieutenant. A few months later, he was appointed to General Egbert Viele's staff with the rank of major and served as provost-marshal of Portsmouth, Virginia. He then served as provost-marshal in Norfolk and was successively on the staff of Generals Barnes, Potter, Wild, and Voges. He was then a permanent aid on General George F. Shipley's staff. In February 1865, he was on duty before Richmond under General Weitzel and entered the city with President Lincoln on April 3, 1865. He was discharged from service in July 1865, and he ended his military service with the rank of Brevet Major.

After the War, Struble spent a year studying law under James Spicer in Dundee. He then went to Albany Law School, graduating from there in 1868. He then began practicing law in Penn Yan with Abraham V. Harpending. When Harpending died in 1871, he practiced law on his own until he formed a new partnership with Charles Baker. In 1877, he formed a partnership with James Spicer which lasted until Spicer moved to Dundee.

Struble was elected District Attorney of Yates County in 1868 and 1871. In 1874, he was elected to the New York State Assembly as a Republican over Democrat George W. Spencer, representing Yates County. He served in the Assembly in 1875. In 1868 and 1869, he was clerk of the Board of Supervisors. In 1869 he was chosen chairman of the Republican County Committee (a position he held for several years). In 1883, he was elected county judge and surrogate, and office he was re-elected to in 1889. He served in that position until 1896.

Struble was a charter member and commander of the local Grand Army of the Republic post. He was a member of the Freemasons. In 1868, he married Laura Backus. They had one child, Clinton Backus Struble.

Struble died at home from Bright's disease on October 25, 1903. He was buried in Lake View Cemetery.

References

External links 

 The Political Graveyard

1842 births
1903 deaths
People from Penn Yan, New York
People of New York (state) in the American Civil War
Union Army officers
Albany Law School alumni
19th-century American lawyers
20th-century American lawyers
County district attorneys in New York (state)
New York (state) state court judges
19th-century American politicians
Republican Party members of the New York State Assembly
19th-century American judges
County judges in the United States
American Freemasons
Grand Army of the Republic officials
Deaths from nephritis
Burials at Lake View Cemetery (Penn Yan, New York)